Bernat Martínez Mas (10 January 1980 – 19 July 2015) was a Spanish motorcycle racer. At international level, he competed in the European Superstock 1000 Championship, the Superbike World Championship, the Supersport World Championship and the Moto2 World Championship. He died on 19 July 2015 along with Dani Rivas due to injuries sustained in an accident in Laguna Seca.

Career statistics

Superbike World Championship

Races by year

Supersport World Championship

Races by year
(key)

Grand Prix motorcycle racing

By season

Races by year
(key)

References

External links

1980 births
2015 deaths
Spanish motorcycle racers
Moto2 World Championship riders
FIM Superstock 1000 Cup riders
Supersport World Championship riders
Superbike World Championship riders
AMA Superbike Championship riders
Motorcycle racers who died while racing